Grant Bartholomaeus (born 17 May 1968) is a former Australian rules footballer who represented the Sydney Swans in the Victorian Football League (VFL) during the 1986 and 1987 seasons.

Bartholomaeus played just four games for the club before being delisted at the end of the 87 season.

References

External links
 
 

1968 births
Living people
Sydney Swans players
Australian rules footballers from New South Wales
New South Wales Australian rules football State of Origin players